Apriona irma is a species of beetle in the family Cerambycidae. It was described by Kriesche in 1919.

References

Batocerini
Beetles described in 1919